Ronald Ulysses Swanson is a fictional character portrayed by Nick Offerman from the situation comedy television series Parks and Recreation on NBC, created by Greg Daniels and Michael Schur. In the series, Ron is the director of the Parks and Recreation department of fictional town of Pawnee, Indiana, and the immediate superior of series protagonist Leslie Knope (Amy Poehler). In demeanor, political philosophy and work ethic, Knope and Swanson are  polar opposites: where Knope is sunny and outgoing, decidedly liberal and constantly working, Swanson is distant, and as a staunch libertarian, is a strong advocate for small government—stating his belief that government should be privatized—and therefore believes that the parks department should not even exist.

Ron, who has an extremely deadpan and stereotypical masculine personality, actively works to make government less effective and despises interacting with the public. He loves meat, woodworking, hunting, Lagavulin whisky, breakfast foods, nautical literature, and sex. He hates and fears his ex-wives, both named Tammy, one of whom is played by Offerman's real-life wife, Megan Mullally. Ron claims not to be interested in the personal lives of those around him but actually cares a great deal about his colleagues and has a particularly strong respect for Leslie.

Conceived by series creators Michael Schur and Greg Daniels, Ron has been a central character since the pilot episode of Parks and Recreation. Offerman had some input into the character's creation, and some aspects of Ron's personality were inspired by the actor, like his affinity for woodworking and 16-year-old Lagavulin Single Malt scotch. The traits of the character were also partially inspired by a real-life Libertarian elected official in Burbank, California.

Offerman's portrayal of Ron Swanson has received widespread critical acclaim. The character developed a cult following and is widely considered the breakout character of the series. Schur called Ron "our cast MVP." He was described by some critics as one of the best characters in a situation comedy in decades, and has been called the best comedic character on television since Cosmo Kramer of Seinfeld. Ron's platonic relationship with Leslie has been compared to that of Mary Richards and Lou Grant in The Mary Tyler Moore Show. Offerman received several award nominations for the role, and won the TCA Award for Individual Achievement in Comedy, tying with Ty Burrell of Modern Family.

Background
Despite Ron being a very private person, including getting his birthdate redacted from all public documents, his background does occasionally come up. He was born in a small town to Tamara "Tammy" Swanson and a father unnamed in the series. He grew up on a farm in a small town and is shown to have enjoyed woodworking from an early age, building his first chair at age 5. Ron is opposed to child labor laws, stating he got his first job at a sheet metal factory at age 9 and, in two weeks, was running the floor. Ron says that at age 11, he was offered a higher paying job at the tannery and attempted to do both jobs while going to middle school before realizing it would be better to only work at the sheet metal factory saying, “don't half-ass two things - whole-ass one thing." Ron claimed that, at age 12, he went to prom and was working at a quarry. When he was 15, Ron moved in with his first wife, Tammy One, who was a candy striper at the hospital when he was born, and subsequently both his math and Sunday school teacher; he has said that although the circumstances of their relationship were considered scandalous, people were too afraid of her to say anything. Ron said that when he was 18, his father wanted him to work at the steel mill, but he chose to go to college instead.

Ron Swanson had been director of Pawnee Parks and Recreation Department for six years at the time Parks and Recreation began. A staunch libertarian, with a distinctive mustache, Ron is an extremely strong advocate for small government. Despite working in a city hall job, he believes all government is a waste of taxpayer money. Ron believes the park system should be privatized and run entirely by corporations for profit, as exemplified by the business model of the Chuck E. Cheese's chain of family entertainment centers. He advocates for program cuts wherever possible, and purposely tries to hire people who are bad at their jobs so they will slow down the government. Ron puts almost no effort into his job, and lets his deputy director Leslie Knope (Amy Poehler) do the vast majority of the work.

Ron particularly despises talking to members of the public, which is why he deliberately designed his office to be uninviting to visitors, in part by mounting a double-barreled, sawed-off shotgun on a swivel atop his desk aimed at the guest chair, so it will be pointed at anyone who wants to speak to him; a claymore mine (which he eventually learns is a toy in the season 7 episode "Leslie and Ron"), the front of which is pointed toward guests; and a Czech hedgehog. Despite his lack of interest in the job, Ron occasionally demonstrates he is a good manager who recognizes the abilities of his co-workers. He claims not to be interested in the personal lives of those around him - often referring to his colleagues as “workplace proximity acquaintances” - and that his best friend was a co-worker he knew for three years without ever learning his name. However, Ron cares more about his colleagues than he lets on and often helps them in spite of himself. Despite sharing a nearly opposite view on the role of government, Ron gets along well with Knope, and the two share a strong mutual respect. Although Leslie had considered a job offer in the neighboring town of Eagleton, she stays based on advice from Ron that, no matter how many job offers she gets, Pawnee will always be her hometown. Ron also developed a grudging, avuncular affection for his assistant April Ludgate's husband, Andy Dwyer, and decided to give him the "Ron Swanson Scholarship" ($940) so Andy can attend a women's studies college course after Andy and April could not afford to pay for it. In the voiceover during which Ron drops Andy off for his first day of class, he recalls his own first day of college when his father dropped him off at the steel mill. His father thought he should not bother with college, but Ron hitched a ride to the school and went anyway.

Ron speaks in a deadpan tone of voice and seldom expresses any kind of emotion, although he is often shown to be very giddy when it comes to riddles and meat. He adheres to many stereotypically masculine traits. He claims to have only cried twice: once when he was hit by a school bus at age 7; secondly when miniature horse Li'l Sebastian died. Ron is an outdoor enthusiast who loves hunting, fishing, camping, and woodworking. For years, Ron has used a park ranger station in the woods as a lodge for private hunting trips with his male colleagues at city hall. He describes fishing as "like yoga, except I still get to kill something." He is particularly attracted to brunettes and what he describes as "strong, self-possessed women at the top of their fields", with professional athletes Steffi Graf and Sheryl Swoopes among his ideal women. He loves breakfast foods and red meats; among the types of food he enjoys are bacon-wrapped shrimp, fried turkey legs inside a grilled hamburger, and bacon-wrapped turkey legs, which are known in Pawnee as "The Swanson." He also drinks heavily (once specifying his weekly consumption of alcohol to be "one shelf") but seldom feels the effects of alcohol or gets hung over, which is shown to be a trait that runs in his family; his mother is able to do the same, and he once mentioned that his father "used to pour Wild Turkey on his cornflakes". He primarily drinks scotch whisky (with a preference for Lagavulin) claiming that "Clear alcohols are for rich women on diets." He is an extremely private person, going so far as to redact his birthday from government documents to keep others from holding parties for him (though he did reluctantly provide it as "springtime" on a hospital admission form). Despite this, Leslie knows about his birthday and regularly gives Ron personal birthday gifts. Ron knows almost nothing about popular culture; he recognizes the name Julia Roberts only as the "toothy gal from Mystic Pizza,” he once confused the Star Wars film franchise with Harry Potter, and on Pawnee Today he reveals that the only movies he's seen at that point are The Bridge on the River Kwai, Patton and Herbie: Fully Loaded (the first having been provided by Leslie on one of his birthdays in the episode "Eagleton" and the latter watched with Diane's two daughters). He enjoys the music of Willie Nelson, being shown listening to "Hello Walls" and "Buddy" during the series. Ron is extremely concerned with the image people have of him and once refused to seek treatment for a hernia; he instead chose to remain immobile at his desk all day and night until April offered to take him to the hospital.

Before the start of Parks and Recreation, Ron has two ex-wives, both of whom are named Tammy, which is also the name of Ron's mother. Ron despises and fears both of his ex-wives, and they are among the few individuals in the world who can break Ron's usually unwavering stoicism. Nevertheless, Ron shares an extremely passionate sexual connection with his second ex-wife; he compared having sex with her to "doing peyote and sneezing, slowly, for six hours", and added, "That woman really knows her way around a penis." Ron is so susceptible to Tammy Two's sexual temptations that he made a video-tape warning himself about her to play in case he ever got back together with her. Ron plays the saxophone, and secretly performs at out-of-town jazz clubs under the name Duke Silver, which he keeps secret from his colleagues in Pawnee. He wears a trilby hat and suit jacket while playing, fronts a band called the Duke Silver Trio, and has released such albums as Memories of Now, Smooth as Silver, and Hi Ho, Duke. His music is especially popular with older women (among them being April's mother), who find Duke Silver extremely attractive.

Ron appears in every episode with the exception of "Beauty Pageant", where it is explained that he is recovering from surgery due to a hernia.

Storyline

Season One
Ron Swanson made his first appearance in the pilot episode of Parks and Recreation, where he repeatedly denies Leslie's requests to pursue turning a construction pit into a park because he does not believe the parks department should build parks at all. He agrees to green-light the project only when city planner Mark Brendanawicz (Paul Schneider) secretly cashes in an unspecified favor in exchange for the approval (Later, in the episode Practice Date, it could be assumed that Mark already knew about Ron's alter ego since he told Tom to visit an Eagleton Club where Tom could see Duke Silver. We can assume that the favor Mark uses, was in return to keep Ron's alter ego a secret.) In a deleted scene from the episode "Canvassing", Ron tries to leave government employment for a previously offered job at an Internet flower company. However, when he finds that business is now doing extremely poorly, Ron sadly realizes he will be in his government job for a long time. In the episode "Boys' Club", Ron attends a disciplinary hearing with Leslie after she gets in trouble when the underage April Ludgate (Aubrey Plaza) is seen drinking alcohol on a video on the Pawnee website. Ron interrupts half-way through the review, defends Leslie and angrily berates the panel for aggressively questioning her. Although Ron claims he did it only due to his hatred for bureaucratic procedures, it is implied that he really did so out of respect for Leslie.

Season Two

In "Practice Date", when the parks department employees hold a contest to find who can learn the biggest secrets about each other, Ron discovers Tom's marriage to the attractive surgeon Wendy (Jama Williamson) is actually a green card marriage. Ron promises he will keep Tom's arrangement a secret. Later, Tom discovers Ron playing the saxophone at a bar in his Duke Silver persona. Tom agrees to keep Ron's secret as well. Later in the season, when Tom's divorce with Wendy is finalized in "Tom's Divorce", Ron politely asks whether Tom would mind if he asked Wendy out himself, and explains, "Looking at her, I feel like she might be the perfect spooning size for me." Tom outwardly claims to be fine with it but, unbeknownst to Ron, is secretly upset because he actually harbors real romantic feelings for Wendy.

Ron's second ex-wife, Pawnee library director Tammy (Megan Mullally), appeared in the episode "Ron and Tammy", where Tammy tricks Leslie into arranging a reunion meeting with Ron under the guise of wishing to work out her differences with him. In fact, Tammy schemed to get Ron to give her the rights to land Leslie plans to turn into a park, so Tammy can build a library branch there instead. During their meeting, Ron and Tammy start loudly arguing, but eventually have passionate sex and get back together. Unable to resist Tammy's charms, Ron asks Leslie to break up with Tammy for him. When Leslie stands up to Tammy in Ron's defense, he is moved by what he describes as the first time any woman has put his needs before her own, and it gives him the strength to finally break up with Tammy.

In "Hunting Trip", Leslie insists that Ron take her and the other female parks department employees on one of his private hunting expeditions at the park ranger cabin. Ron begrudgingly agrees, but is frustrated to learn that Leslie is in fact an excellent hunter who overshadows his own abilities. During this trip, Ron is shot in the back of the head by misfired birdshot, and becomes hallucinatory and furious after taking multiple painkillers with alcohol. He initially accuses Leslie of shooting him based on her desire to prove herself, but later learns Tom was at fault and that Leslie took the blame to keep Tom from being arrested for hunting without a license. Ron is strongly impressed that Leslie defended Tom this way, and refers to her as "a stand-up guy", which leaves Leslie overjoyed.

In "The Set Up", a new citywide effort is implemented to make government officials more accessible to Pawnee residents, an idea which Ron condemns as "my hell." As a result, he seeks to hire an assistant who will shield him from the public and allow him to continue doing nothing. After interviewing several candidates, he chooses April Ludgate, convinced her constant apathy and negative attitude will suit him perfectly. Their relationship proves very harmonious until the episode "94 Meetings", when April accidentally schedules nearly 93 meetings not counting one with her, on a single day. April previously kept people who wanted to meet with Ron away by scheduling them for a meeting on March 31, a date she wrongly believed was nonexistent. When March 31 actually comes around, Ron has to enroll help from others in the park department to handle the meetings. He becomes so furious with April that she quits, but Ron later apologizes and hires her back.

In "The Master Plan", state auditors Chris Traeger (Rob Lowe) and Ben Wyatt (Adam Scott) arrive in Pawnee and announce that due to the city's crippling budget problems, they have to slash each department budget by up to 50 percent and briefly shut down the government completely. While Leslie is horrified, the anti-government Ron is delighted by the idea, becoming so giddy that he asks the auditors what cuts they will be making and if he can be allowed to "watch while eating pork cracklins." In the season finale, "Freddy Spaghetti", Ron is assigned to a committee tasked with identifying budget cuts, a job which he enjoys thoroughly. However, when Ben and Chris reveal they are considering firing Leslie, Ron passionately defends her and insists they should fire him instead. During the final scene of the episode and season, Tom spots Ron and Wendy together in city hall and realizes with horror that they are now dating.

Season Three
The third season opens with Ron seen begrudgingly returning to his city hall job after the Pawnee government has been shut down for three months. Ron starts to become a father figure of sorts to April and Andy (Chris Pratt) during the third season, despite his insistence that "I'm not interested in caring about people." When April is hospitalized with influenza in "Flu Season", she starts to explain her relationship problems with Andy, but Ron insists he does not want to know about her private affairs. However, after Ron hires Andy to be her temporary replacement, the two spend the day bonding and Ron, against his better judgment, tells Andy that April is in the hospital and that he should visit her. Later in the season, in "Media Blitz", Ron gets even further involved by chastising April for leading Andy on, and urges her to either forgive Andy or move on. His advice ultimately helps April decide to forgive Andy.

Ron finds himself very happy in his relationship with Wendy, although it creates tension between him and Tom. This tension culminates in "Ron & Tammy: Part Two", when Tom brings Tammy to a party as his date simply to aggravate Ron. This occurs, however, the same day that Wendy and Ron break up, after she decides she must move back to Canada to care for her ailing parents. Ron and Tammy end up having a wild night of drinking and sex, in which Ron gets cornrows, he and Tammy get remarried and the two end up in jail. The parks department employees hold an intervention to try to convince Ron to leave Tammy, but their efforts are unsuccessful. After Tom reveals that Tammy only went to the party with him to make Ron miserable, Tammy brutally beats up Tom. This makes Ron remember how horrible Tammy is and he leaves her, thus ending their marriage for a second time, and Ron and Tom later reconcile.

Shortly after Leslie successfully relaunches the Pawnee harvest festival, she struggles to find any new ideas for future parks project. She becomes so stressed that Ron, in the episode "Camping", locks her in a room and refuses to let her out until she gets some sleep. She awakens the next day refreshed and full of ideas. Ron attends Andy and April's wedding in "Andy and April's Fancy Party", where he has the first dance with April. When Leslie grows concerned they are rushing into their marriage, Ron insists it is not her place to say what works for them, and offers the advice: "Leslie I got married twice, both times I was a lot older than those two and both marriages ended in divorce...and a burning effigy. Who's to say what works? You find somebody you like, and you roll the dice, its all anyone can do."  At which point Leslie Knope replies "Wait, weren't you married 3 times?" To which Ron replies "My God you're right. I get to burn another effigy." In "Eagleton", Leslie discovers Ron's birthday, which he previously kept secret, and he fearfully suspects Leslie is planning an extravagant party for him. However, her surprise party for Ron is instead a quiet, private one more appropriate for Ron's personality: an evening alone with a steak, scotch, and copies of his favorite movies.

When city manager Chris Traeger tries to remove red meat from the city hall cafeteria as part of a government-wide health initiative in "Soulmates", Ron intervenes by challenging Chris to a cook-off. Chris agrees to abandon his plan if Ron's regular hamburgers are deemed better than his lean meat turkey burgers. Although Ron exerts little effort compared to Chris, his burgers easily win the contest. In "Road Trip", Ron reluctantly agrees to be interviewed by a young girl for her school assignment, during which he explains his libertarian beliefs about small government, and illustrates the concept of taxes by eating 40 percent of her lunch. The two bond, and he ends the day by giving her a claymore landmine as a gift. Ron gets in trouble the next day when the girl's mother explains her daughter's assignment was "Why Government Matters", and that Lauren simply wrote "It doesn't."

Ron learns in the third-season finale, "Li'l Sebastian", that Leslie and Ben are secretly having an affair despite Chris' ban on workplace romances, and he warns them they are risking a political scandal that could cost them their jobs. Later, at the funeral of Pawnee's celebrity miniature horse Li'l Sebastian, Ron is nearly killed as a result of Leslie and Ben's affair. When their efforts to hide their relationship accidentally cause Li'l Sebastian's eternal flame to be filled with lighter fluid instead of propane, Ron creates a massive fireball when he lights it, which burns off his eyebrows and part of his mustache. The season ends as a horrified Ron learns that his first ex-wife, Tammy, has arrived to see him; the news is enough to make his second ex-wife, also named Tammy, run away in horror.

Season Four
In "I'm Leslie Knope", Ron grabs an emergency survival bag and flees to live in the wilderness after learning that his first ex-wife Tammy 1 (Patricia Clarkson) has arrived in town.  When Leslie's campaign managers decide to announce her candidacy for city council sooner than expected, she panics and also flees to the wilderness to hide out with Ron.  Together they realize they cannot run from their problems and they both return to the parks department.  Tammy 1, who is an IRS agent, later meets up with Ron in his office and serves him audit papers.

In "Ron and Tammys" Tammy 1 assumes control of Ron, turning him into a mustache-less pushover in an effort to remarry him and take all his hidden gold.  This is quite the difference compared to the influence Ron's latest ex (Tammy 2) has over him.  While Tammy 1 has an ice cold personality and reduces Ron into submissiveness and quietude, Tammy 2 causes Ron to make highly irrational decisions that end up jeopardizing his position at the Parks office.  Tammy 2 also tries to assume control of Ron through using manipulation of her body.  Ron is saved from the grasp of Tammy 1 after his own mother, who is also ironically a Tammy- her name is Tamara (he refers to her as Tammy 0) to restore her son.  He snaps back to his old self after witnessing a drinking contest between Tammy 1 and Tammy 0.  They then drink in order to win control over Ron. Leslie also enters this competition in hopes of freeing him of the Tammys, however she ends up failing miserably due to the high alcohol content of Swanson family mash and is the first one out of the contest. In the end, Ron finally comes to his senses and stands up for himself and tells both Tammys to leave.

Season Five
In "How a Bill becomes a Law", Ron meets Diane Lewis (Lucy Lawless) who had been ignored when asking about filling in a pothole. Ron becomes a friend of hers and, in "Halloween Surprise", he takes her two daughters out trick-or-treating and they begin dating.
In "Women in Garbage", while babysitting Diane's daughters, he admits to Ann he loves Diane. Later in the episode, she admits she also loves him.
In the fifth-season finale "Are You Better Off?", Andy is talking to Ron about a pregnancy test he found when Diane comes in and says she needs to talk to him, leaving the question if she is pregnant in a cliffhanger.

Season Six
In the sixth-season premiere "London", Diane reveals that she is pregnant. Ron proposes, and she accepts on the condition they not have a huge wedding. They immediately get married on the fourth floor before he joins Leslie on a trip to London, which he despises, and the Lagavulin distillery in Scotland, which he heartily enjoys. Later in the season, Ron and Diane have a son, whom they name Jon. During The Unity Concert in the season finale, Ron reveals himself as Duke Silver to the public when he takes the stage with Mouse Rat.

Season Seven
Three years after Season 6, at the start of Season 7 in 2017, Leslie and Ron's relationship ("work-place proximity associates", as Ron calls his friends) has collapsed into one of complete animosity. Both have left the Parks Department—Ron has started his own construction company, while Leslie works for the National Park Service—and are competing in a bidding war for a piece of land in Pawnee owned by the Newport family: Leslie wishes to turn it into a national park, while Ron's company has partnered with GRYZZL to turn it into a new corporate campus. Despite a brief truce to rescue Councilman Jamm from the clutches of Ron's ex-wife Tammy II, their relationship continues to deteriorate, until it reaches its nadir after a pair of press conferences to publicize their respective proposals. Leslie and Ron bitterly hurl insults at one another, prompting Ben and the rest of their teams to lock them in the Pawnee Parks Department overnight, refusing to let them out until they reconcile. After much prying, Leslie learns the real story from Ron's side: After she took Jerry and April to work with her, and Tom and Donna left to run their businesses, Ron didn't recognize anyone he worked with anymore. This prompted him to make the unthinkable decision to ask Leslie for a job in the federal government, so he could work with people he knew again. However, Leslie unknowingly stood him up for lunch due to her new hectic life, which he felt was the "punctuation mark on a sentence that had already been written." So, Ron left the Parks Department to begin his construction company. He and Leslie are eventually able to settle their differences and rekindle their friendship.

In a series of flash-forwards in the final episode, it is shown that Ron decides to leave his now-successful construction company. He is shown talking to Ben Wyatt about having diversified his funds by selling half his gold. The flash-forward reveals that Ron purchased 51% interest in the Lagavulin distillery. Feeling his life lacks purpose, he asks Leslie for advice and she arranges for him to be the new superintendent of the Pawnee National Park. One of the last shots of Ron in the series features him "at work", happily paddling a canoe around the lake in the park to the tune of "Buddy" by Willie Nelson.

Development

Ron Swanson was created by Parks and Recreation creators Greg Daniels and Michael Schur, although Nick Offerman himself had some input into the character's creation. Offerman said in July 2012 that "NBC really resisted giving me this part. It took five months for me from the time Mike Schur and Greg Daniels said they wanted me to play this part. NBC insisted on auditioning every other guy in the country, and then they finally acquiesced." The character's traits were partially inspired by a real-life Libertarian elected official that Parks and Recreation co-creator Michael Schur encountered in Burbank while researching for the show, who favored as little government interference as possible and admitted, "I don't really believe in the mission of my job... I'm aware of the irony." Ron is also partially inspired by political appointees of President George W. Bush who were perceived to be opposed to the branch of government they were overseeing. Ron's signature mustache was one of the first ideas conceived for the character. Offerman said the deadpan style of humor he uses for Ron Swanson was cultivated during his youth, when he was an altar boy: "I would read things with the utmost sincerity, and my cousin would be cracking up because he knew I was full of shit."

Many aspects of Ron's character are based on those of Nick Offerman in real life, such as his woodworking abilities; Offerman runs an independent carpentry business called Offerman Woodshop. Offerman also plays saxophone in real life, just as Ron does, although the Parks and Recreation writers did not know this when they wrote this element of his character. Offerman's real-life training in stage combat and Kabuki dance were the partial inspiration for self-defense classes Ron offered his parks department colleagues in "Park Safety." Ron's second ex-wife Tammy, who first appeared in the episode "Ron and Tammy", was played by comedian and actress Megan Mullally, Offerman's real-life wife. The idea of Ron hating his ex-wife Tammy was established early in the creation of the character, and it was Schur who conceived the idea of casting Mullally, an idea to which Offerman was extremely responsive.

Ron became more heavily involved in Parks and Recreation storylines during the second season, and Offerman largely credited Schur with the development of the character. Schur has described Offerman as a "once-in-a-generation comedic performer", and "our cast MVP, and in many ways our cast leader." He compared Ron to a "19th-century rugged individualist", and said of creating the character, "A lot of the credit has to go to Nick Offerman. In real life, he's an incredibly interesting guy, and at the very least, it's much easier to play an interesting guy when you're an interesting guy." Offerman said his own sense of humor fuels much of the character, along with those of Schur, Greg Daniels, and the writing staff; he added: "I never dreamed that I could prosper with my perverse sense of humor on a network show." Schur said the staff liked writing for Ron because "he's a great mix of a superhero, and also a deeply flawed, and very human and vulnerable person."

Reception

Reviews

The character of Ron Swanson received universal acclaim; he developed a cult following and is widely considered the show's breakout character. Joel Keller of TV Squad called Ron "one of the more inspired sitcom characters of the last decade", Zap2it writer Joel Keller called him one of the best sitcom characters since Cosmo Kramer of Seinfeld, and Geoff Berkshire of Variety said that the character would "go down in TV history as one of the all-time comedy greats." Gabriel Perna of International Business Times wrote, "Offerman's Ron Swanson is one of the main reasons to watch Parks and Recreation. Considering how funny the show is and the scope of its cast, that says a lot." Likewise, Gail Pennington, television critic with the St. Louis Post-Dispatch, called Nick Offerman "the funniest guy on TV", and TV Fanatic writer Eric Hochberger said, "There's [a] certain character I watch this show for: Ron Swanson." Jonah Weiner of Slate.com said Ron "has regularly stolen his scenes" and that Offerman has "a gift for understated physical comedy", and Steve Heisler of The A.V. Club said Offerman was not only funny, but capable of expressing a surprising range of emotions.

During the second season, HitFix writer Alan Sepinwall called Ron "easily the show's best creation so far", and during the third season he wrote, "Ron being both awesome and hilarious is something Nick Offerman and these writers can do in their sleep by now." Sal Basile of UGO Networks wrote, "How anyone can make Ron Swanson of Parks and Recreation likable is beyond us, but Offerman does it effortlessly. Before we knew it we couldn't wait to see Swanson's reactions to the slightest of problems." Matt Fowler of IGN was critical of Ron at the start of the show, and called him "a bit of the dud (who) offers little to the show, and almost just stand to sour the whole thing." However, by the second season, Fowler said the character had improved and became "an absolute stand-out in the series." Several reviewers have praised the platonic relationship between Ron and Leslie, which has been compared to that of Mary Richards and Lou Grant in The Mary Tyler Moore Show.

The second-season episode "Ron and Tammy", which predominantly featured Ron and his second ex-wife, is widely considered one of the best Parks and Recreation episodes. Offerman was particularly praised for his subtle minimalism and facial expressions, particularly the use of his eyebrows. Based on a line from "The Stakeout", when Ron says, "I was born ready. I'm Ron fucking Swanson", he is often referenced by fans and even reviewers as "Ron Fucking Swanson." Fans created websites based on him like "Cats That Look Like Ron Swanson", and after Ron misunderstood a turkey burger to be "a fried turkey leg inside a grilled hamburger", the cooking website Eater.com created and posted a recipe for that exact food. An image of a fake flavor of Ron Swanson-themed Ben & Jerry's ice cream, called "All of the Bacon & Eggs You Have", was designed and circulated on the Internet. The Ben & Jerry's corporation responded positively to the image, and said in a statement, "Ron's beliefs are in accordance with those of Ben & Jerry's – where two scoops of government can help the less fortunate and truly be a servant to the community and its citizens."

Paste ranked him No. 2 in its list of the 20 Best Characters of 2011, saying: "In four seasons, Ron has become the standout in a cast of incredible characters, and already seems poised to join the elite list of TV’s greatest comedic characters."

Awards
In 2010, Nick Offerman received a Television Critics Association Award nomination for Individual Achievement in Comedy for his performance as Ron Swanson, although the award was ultimately given to Jane Lynch for her performance in the musical comedy-drama Glee. Also that year, Nick Offerman received a nomination for Best Supporting Actor in a Comedy from Entertainment Weekly's Ewwy Awards.

Despite critical success, Offerman never received an Emmy Award nomination for this role. Several reviewers expressed particular surprise that he did not receive a nomination for the 63rd Primetime Emmy Awards in 2011, which many considered the biggest snub of the season. Amy Poehler in particular was outraged by Offerman's snub, and said it was "a hot load of bullshit that [Offerman] didn't get nominated." Multiple other actors, including Michelle Forbes and Ty Burrell (the latter of whom received a nomination in, and eventually won, the category Offerman was competing in) stated that they believed Offerman should have been nominated, and Burrell added that Offerman deserved the nomination more than he.

References

External links
 Nick Offerman biography at official Parks and Recreation site at NBC.com
 DukeSilver.com

American male characters in television
Fictional businesspeople
Fictional carpenters
Fictional government officials
Fictional hunters
Fictional jazz musicians
Fictional park rangers
Parks and Recreation characters
Television characters introduced in 2009